Urvil Patel (born 17 October 1998) is an Indian cricketer. He made his Twenty20 debut for Baroda in the 2017–18 Zonal T20 League on 7 January 2018. He made his List A debut for Baroda in the 2017–18 Vijay Hazare Trophy on 7 February 2018.

Ahead of the 2018–19 Ranji Trophy, he transferred from Baroda to Gujarat.

His nattive palace village kahipur

References

External links
 

1998 births
Living people
Indian cricketers
Baroda cricketers
Gujarat cricketers
Place of birth missing (living people)